Francesco Gullino (or Giullino) (31 May 1945 – 8 August 2021) was a Dane of Italian origin who was named in June 2005 by The Times as the prime suspect in the 1978 "Bulgarian umbrella" murder of Bulgarian dissident Georgi Markov. He was born in Bra, Piedmont, Italy and was known by the code name "Piccadilly".

According to Bulgarian journalist Hristo Hristov, Gullino was an occasional smuggler arrested twice in Bulgaria and given the choice of going to prison or becoming a secret agent in the West. Based in Copenhagen with a cover as an art dealer, Gullino was supposedly active until 1990 and received two Bulgarian state medals “for services to security and public order”. He was briefly detained in 1993 and questioned by the British and Danish police in Copenhagen and, according to Hristov, then dropped out of sight.

Although Gullino admitted to having been in London when Markov was murdered, he always denied having been involved in any way.

A British documentary, The Umbrella Assassin (2006), interviewed people connected with the case in Bulgaria, Britain and the United States, and revealed that Gullino was alive and well.

Gullino was found dead in his apartment in Wels in Upper Austria in August 2021.

References

Citations

Other sources

Brunwasser, Matthew (2008), “A Book Peels Back Some Layers of a Cold War Mystery”, The New York Times, 10 September 2008.

1945 births
2021 deaths
Italian emigrants to Denmark
People from Bra, Piedmont